Guglielmo Cavallo (born 18 August 1938 in Carovigno) is an Italian palaeographer, Emeritus Professor of the Sapienza University of Rome.

Life 
Cavallo graduated from the University of Bari in 1961, with Carlo Ferdinando Russo; shortly after, he became assistant of Alessandro Pratesi, then Professor of palaeography and diplomatic. In 1969, he moved to Rome and first became assistant of Greek Palaeography at the Special School for Archivists and Librarians (then Professor of Latin paleography since 1975), also teaching 'Storia della tradizione manoscritta' (History of the manuscript tradition) at the 'Sapienza' University of Rome. In 1978, he became Professor of Greek Palaeography in Rome. He retired from his teaching duties in 2008 and was nominated Emeritus.

As of 2022, he is the President of the Comitato per l'edizione nazionale dei classici greci e latini (i.e. 'Committee for the National Edition of Greek and Latin Classical [Texts]') and Coordinator of its periodical journal, the Bollettino dei Classici.

Research activity 
Cavallo is one of the leading Italian palaeographers, specializing in papyrology, Greek and Latin writing of the Ancient and Medieval times and history of the manuscript tradition. His first major academic publication was an extensive study of Greek uncial (also known as 'Biblical uncial'). In 1974, he delivered a paper at the International Colloquium of Greek Palaeography held in Paris, proposing a new method for studying Greek uncial of the VIII–IX centuries. In 1983, Cavallo produced the first catalogue of Greek hands found in the Herculaneum papyri.

He examined and described Codex Basilensis A. N. III. 12 and dated it to the early 8th century. He examined Papyrus 39, Uncial 059, 0175, 0187, Lectionary 1386 and many other Greek manuscripts from the Byzantine period and organized and directed facsimile editions of Greek manuscripts such as the Codex Purpureus Rossanensis and the Dioscurides Neapolitanus and the 25th and the 19th volumes of the Chartae Latinae Antiquiores (ChLA). In 1997, with Giovanna Nicolaj, he founded the second series of the ChLA (Chartae Latinae Antiquiores series II – ChLA2), containing volumes L to CXVI and voll. CXVII (appendix to Italy) and CXVIII (appendix to Switzerland, Luxembourg and Spain). He also edited facsimiles of Greek and Latin manuscripts and two collections of reproductions, with commentary, of Greek literary hands from the early Byzantine and Hellenistic periods, with H. Maehler. In 2008, he published an handbook of Greek and Latin Palaeography of papyri.

With Italian philologist Luca Canali he edited a collection of Roman epigraphs with translation and commentary; with Italian medievalist Giovanni Orlandi he edited the Histories of Rodulfus Glaber; in 2017, he wrote the introduction to the first volume of the Italian edition of Niketas Choniates' History.

He authored and/or edited around 500 scientific works, many of them have been translated into foreign languages.

Reception of Cavallo's works by other scholars 
In 1970, Paul Canart (then scriptor Graecus – i.e. conservator of Greek manuscripts – at the Vatican Library and one of the worldwide leading scholars in Greek palaeography) published an article praising Cavallo's work on Greek uncial. Ten years later, Armando Petrucci described Cavallo as the "major specialist" in Greek Palaeography.

Works 
The complete bibliography up to 2004 can be found in

Books

Editions of texts

Facsimiles, specimina

Monographs

Authored books

Edited books

Papers, essays 
Papers followed by (*) have been reprinted with addenda in Il calamo e il papiro (2005).

 (* 17–42)
 (* 151–162)
 (* 43–72)
 (* 163–174)
 (* 175–202)

References

External links 
 Cavallo, Guglielmo: Byzantines
 Guglielmo Cavallo  AIPD
 Dipartimento di Studi sulle società e le culture del Medioevo - Università "La Sapienza" di Roma

1938 births
Italian palaeographers
Living people
Italian Byzantinists
People from the Province of Brindisi
20th-century Italian historians
21st-century Italian historians
Scholars of Byzantine history